Paganini is an operetta in three acts by Franz Lehár.

Lehár composed the work as a vehicle for Richard Tauber, the acclaimed Austrian tenor, though he assumed the role (with Vera Schwarz as the princess) in Berlin on 30 January 1926, rather than the Vienna premiere which was at the Johann Strauss Theater on 30 October 1925 with Carl Clewing in the title role. Tauber's contract with the Berlin State Opera required him to be in Stockholm at the time of the Vienna premiere. The operetta was so coolly received in Vienna that the Berlin impresario, Heinz Saltenberg, was reluctant to mount it at the  without guarantees against losses. In the event, Tauber and Schwarz made it a huge success in Berlin, where it ran for three months. A new production was mounted in Berlin at the Theater des Westens in April 1930, again with Tauber and Schwarz, and the composer conducting at the opening night on Easter Sunday.

An English version with lyrics by A. P. Herbert was presented by C. B. Cochran at the Lyceum Theatre in London in May 1937, with Tauber as Paganini and Evelyn Laye as Anna Elisa. They recorded seven numbers from the show for Parlophone Records, including the new number 'Fear Nothing' that Lehár had written for the London production.

In 1934 the operetta was adapted into the German film Paganini.

Roles

Synopsis
Set in Lucca, the story concerns the love affair of Niccolò Paganini, the irresistibly charming violinist, with Élisa Bonaparte, the arts and theatre-loving younger sister of Napoleon.

Notable arias 
 "Schönes Italien" (Paganini)
 "Liebe, du Himmel auf Erden" (Maria Anna Elisa)
 "Mit den Frau'n auf Du und Du" (Bella Giretti – Pimpinelli)
 "Niemand liebt dich so wie ich" (Maria Anna Elisa – Paganini)
 "Einmal möcht' ich was Närrisches tun" (Bella Giretti – Pimpinelli)
 "Gern hab ich die Fraun geküsst" (Paganini)
 "Deinen süssen Rosenmund..." (Paganini)
 "Wo meine Wiege stand, ich weiss es nicht" (Maria Anna Elisa)

Recordings
Lehár: Paganini, Bavarian State Opera Chorus, Bavarian Symphony Orchestra; conductor: Willi Boskovsky; principal singers: Nicolai Gedda, Anneliese Rothenberger, Heinz Zednik, Benno Kusche, Olivera Miljaković, Friedrich Lenz; Recording date: 1977; Label: EMI Classics CD 65968

References

Lamb, Andrew (1992), "Paganini" in The New Grove Dictionary of Opera, ed. Stanley Sadie (London) 

Operas by Franz Lehár
German-language operettas
1925 operas
Operas
Operas adapted into films
Operas based on real people
Operas set in Italy
Operas set in the 19th century
Works about music and musicians
Cultural depictions of Niccolò Paganini